The 2014–15 season Deportivo de La Coruña season is the club's 108th season in its history and its 43rd in La Liga, the top-flight of Spanish football.

Squad
As 2014..

Current squad

Pre-season and friendlies

Statistics

Appearances and goals
Updated as of 30 May 2015.

|-
! colspan=10 style=background:#dcdcdc; text-align:center| Players who have made an appearance or had a squad number this season but have been loaned out or transferred

|}

Competitions

La Liga

League table

Matches
Kickoff times are in CET.

Copa del Rey

Round of 32

Results by round

References

Deportivo de La Coruña seasons
Deportivo de La Coruna